Neiman Gracie Stambowsky (born December 12, 1988)  is a Brazilian mixed martial artist and Brazilian jiu-jitsu practitioner. A two-time Pan-American champion in coloured belts, Gracie medalled at the 2013 black belt World No-Gi Championship before transitioning to MMA competing in the Welterweight division of Bellator MMA. Gracie has also previously fought for the World Series of Fighting. 

Gracie is a 4th generation member of the Gracie Family of Brazilian jiu-jitsu, great-grandson of Gracie jiu-jitsu founder Carlos Gracie as well as the son of 8th degree coral belt Márcio Stambowsky. As of February 7, 2023, he is #6 in the Bellator Welterweight Rankings.

Early life
Neiman Gracie was born on 12 December 1988 in Rio de Janeiro, Brazil. Gracie is the son of Carla Gracie (daughter of Robson Gracie), and Márcio Stambowsky. Like his father, he was raised Jewish, making him "one of MMA's most notable Jews." He is a 4th generation member of the Gracie Family of Brazilian jiu-jitsu. He is billed professionally as "Neiman Gracie", using his mother's surname. His sister Deborah Gracie Stambowsky is the second female in the Gracie family to achieve the rank of black belt, behind their first-cousin Kyra Gracie. Gracie started training Brazilian jiu-jitsu as a child at age 7.

Brazilian jiu-jitsu career
As a purple belt Gracie won the Pan American Championship (both Gi and No-Gi), the American National and the NY International Open. As a black belt, he won bronze at the 2013 World Nogi Brazilian Jiu-Jitsu Championship and silver at the 2012 and 2015 IBJJF New York International Open Championship.

Mixed martial arts career

World Series of Fighting
In 2013, Gracie set his sights on competing in mixed martial arts. He signed with the World Series of Fighting promotion and made his debut in September 2013 at World Series of Fighting 5: Arlovski vs. Kyle, facing Darren Costa. He won the fight via submission in the first round.

Gracie returned to the WSOF decagon on July 5, 2014 at World Series of Fighting 11: Gaethje vs. Newell, facing Dustin Holyko.  He again won the fight via submission, this time in the second round.

Bellator MMA

On October 29, 2014, it was announced that the undefeated Gracie had signed with Bellator MMA.

Gracie made his Bellator debut against Bobby Flynn on February 27, 2015 at Bellator 134. He won the fight via submission in the first round.

For his second fight with the promotion, Gracie faced Roger Carroll at Bellator 151 on March 4, 2016.  He won the fight by unanimous decision.

In his third fight for Bellator, Gracie faced Rudy Bears at Bellator 163 on November 4, 2016. He won the fight via submission in the first round.

Gracie faced Dave Marfone at Bellator NYC on June 24, 2017.  He won the fight via submission in the second round.

Gracie was expected to face Javier Torres at Bellator 185 on October 20, 2017. Gracie's opponent was changed to Zak Bucia after an injury to Torres. As a result of the Brennan Ward vs David Rickels match being removed from the card, also due to injury, the bout was elevated to co-main event. Gracie won the fight by submission due to a neck crank in the second round.

In his sixth fight for the promotion, Gracie faced Javier Torres at Bellator 198 on April 28, 2018. He won the fight via arm-triangle choke submission in the second round.

Bellator Welterweight World Grand Prix and title shot
Gracie next entered the Bellator Welterweight Grand Prix. He faced Ed Ruth in the quarterfinals at Bellator 213 on December 15, 2018. He won the fight via rear-naked choke submission in the fourth round.

Gracie faced Rory MacDonald in the semi-finals at Bellator 222 on June 14, 2019. He lost the fight by unanimous decision.

Post-Grand Prix
Gracie was expected to face Kiichi Kunimoto at Bellator 236 on December 21, 2019. However, Gracie had to withdraw from the bout due to an injury and was replaced by Jason Jackson.

Gracie faced Jon Fitch at Bellator 246 on September 12, 2020. Gracie won the bout via second round submission.

Gracie faced Jason Jackson at Bellator 255 on April 2, 2021. He lost the bout via unanimous decision.

Gracie faced Mark Lemminger on September 18, 2021 at Bellator 266. He won the bout via TKO in the first round, collecting his first knockout win of his career.

Gracie faced Logan Storley on February 19, 2022 at Bellator 274. He lost the mostly standup bout via unanimous decision.

Gracie faced Goiti Yamauchi on August 12, 2022 at Bellator 284. He lost the bout in the second round after being knocked out by an uppercut.

Gracie was scheduled to face Michael Lombardo on February 4, 2023 at Bellator 290. Two weeks before the event, Lombardo was forced to withdraw from the bout and he was replaced by Dante Schiro. Gracie dominated the bout on the way to a unanimous decision victory.

Instructor lineage 
Kano Jigoro → Mitsuyo "Count Koma" Maeda → Carlos Gracie → Helio Gracie →  Carlos Gracie Jr. > Renzo Gracie > Neiman Gracie

Championships and achievements

Brazilian jiu-jitsu 
Main Achievements (at black belt level):
 2nd Place NY International Open Championship (2012)
 2nd Place NY Summer Open Championship (2015)
 3rd Place IBJJF World No-Gi Championship 3rd Place (2013 black)

Main Achievements (at colored belts):
 IBJJF Pan American Champion (2008 purple)
 IBJJF Pan American No-Gi Champion (2008 purple)
 IBJJF American National Champion (2007 purple)
 NY International Open Champion (2009 purple)
 2nd Place NY International Open Championship (2010 purple)
 3rd Place IBJJF World Championship (2008 purple, 2005 blue junior)
 3rd Place IBJJF Pan American Championship (2007/2009 purple)
 3rd Place IBJJF Pan American No-Gi Championship (2011 brown)
 3rd Place Brazilian National Championship (2004 blue junior)
 3rd Place IBJJF NY International Open Championship (2009 purple, 2011 brown)

Mixed martial arts
Bellator MMA
Bellator Welterweight Grand Prix Semifinalist
Second most submission wins in Bellator MMA history (seven)
Most submission wins in Bellator MMA Welterweight division history (six)

Mixed martial arts record

|-
|Win
|align=center|12–4
|Dante Schiro
|Decision (unanimous)
|Bellator 290
|
|align=center|3
|align=center|5:00
|Inglewood, California, United States
|
|-
|Loss
|align=center|11–4
|Goiti Yamauchi
|KO (punches)
|Bellator 284
|
|align=center|2
|align=center|3:58
|Sioux Falls, South Dakota, United States
|
|-
|Loss
|align=center|11–3
|Logan Storley
|Decision (unanimous)
|Bellator 274
|
| align=center| 5
| align=center| 5:00
|Uncasville, Connecticut, United States
|
|- 
|Win
|align=center|11–2
|Mark Lemminger	
|TKO (elbows and punches)
|Bellator 266
|
|align=center|1
|align=center|1:27
|San Jose, California, United States
|
|-
|Loss
|align=center|10–2
|Jason Jackson
|Decision (unanimous)
|Bellator 255
|
|align=center|3
|align=center|5:00
|Uncasville, Connecticut, United States
|
|-
|Win
|align=center|10–1
|Jon Fitch
|Submission (heel hook)
|Bellator 246
|
|align=center|2
|align=center|4:47
|Uncasville, Connecticut, United States
|
|-
|Loss
|align=center|9–1
|Rory MacDonald 
|Decision (unanimous)
|Bellator 222
|
|align=center|5
|align=center|5:00
|New York City, New York, United States
|
|-
|Win
|align=center|9–0
|Ed Ruth
|Submission (rear-naked choke)
|Bellator 213
|
|align=center|4
|align=center|2:17
|Honolulu, Hawaii, United States
|
|-
|Win
|align=center|8–0
|Javier Torres
|Submission (arm-triangle choke)
|Bellator 198
|
|align=center|2
|align=center|3:18
|Rosemont, Illinois, United States
|
|-
|Win
|align=center|7–0
|Zak Bucia
|Submission (neck crank)
|Bellator 185
|
|align=center|2
|align=center|2:27
|Uncasville, Connecticut, United States
|
|-
|Win
|align=center|6–0
|Dave Marfone
|Submission (rear-naked choke)
|Bellator NYC
|
|align=center|2
|align=center|2:27
|New York City, New York, United States
|
|-
| Win
| align=center|5–0
|Rudy Bears
| Submission (armbar)
| Bellator 163
| 
| align=center|1
| align=center|4:39
| Uncasville, Connecticut, United States
| 
|-
|Win 
|align=center|4–0
|Roger Carroll
|Decision (unanimous)
|Bellator 151
|
|align=center|3
|align=center|5:00
|Thackerville, Oklahoma, United States
|
|-
|Win 
|align=center|3–0
|Bobby Flynn
|Submission (neck crank)
|Bellator 134
|
|align=center|1
|align=center|2:36
|Uncasville, Connecticut, United States
| 
|-
|Win 
|align=center|2–0
|Dustin Holyko 
|Submission (rear-naked choke)
|WSOF 11
|
|align=center|2
|align=center|2:21
|Daytona Beach, Florida, United States
| 
|-
|Win
|align=center|1–0
|Darren Costa
|Submission (armbar)
|WSOF 5
|
|align=center|1
|align=center|3:57
|Atlantic City, New Jersey, United States
|

Personal life
Gracie and his wife Karina have one daughter, Khali (born 2018).

See also
 List of Brazilian jiu-jitsu practitioners
 List of current Bellator fighters

Notes

References

Brazilian male mixed martial artists
Gracie family
People awarded a black belt in Brazilian jiu-jitsu
Sportspeople from Rio de Janeiro (city)
1988 births
Living people
Welterweight mixed martial artists
Jewish Brazilian sportspeople
Jewish male martial artists
Brazilian people of Russian-Jewish descent
Mixed martial artists utilizing Brazilian jiu-jitsu
Brazilian jiu-jitsu practitioners who have competed in MMA (men)